The Loyalist Communities Council (LCC) is a group in Northern Ireland with representatives from the UVF, UDA and Red Hand Commando. It was launched on 13 October 2015 in response to the perceived neglect and political disenfranchisement of working class loyalists.

In the 2017 UK general election the LCC issued a statement supporting the DUP and the UUP. However, this support was rejected by both parties.

During the Brexit negotiations they said that they were "strongly opposed" to the proposed Withdrawal Agreement due to the treatment of the Irish border question. In late February 2021 the DUP met with the LCC to discuss the Northern Ireland Protocol. In early March 2021 the LCC declared that, as a result of its opposition to the protocol, it was temporarily removing its support for the Good Friday Agreement.

The LCC have repeatedly called for Unionist flags to be taken down outside the "marching season".

References

Ulster loyalist organisations
Ulster unionist organisations